Armstrong Mountain is a mountain located in Essex County, New York, named after Thomas Armstrong, a local pioneer. 
The mountain is part of the Great Range of the Adirondack Mountains.
Armstrong Mtn. is flanked to the southwest by Gothics, and to the northeast by Upper Wolfjaw Mountain.

Armstrong Mountain stands within the watershed of the East Branch of the Ausable River, which drains into Lake Champlain, thence into Canada's Richelieu River, the Saint Lawrence River, and into the Gulf of Saint Lawrence.
The east side of Armstrong Mtn. drains into the East Branch of the Ausable River. 
The west side of Armstrong Mtn. drains into Ore Bed Brook, thence into Johns Brook and the East Branch.

Armstrong Mountain is within the High Peaks Wilderness Area of Adirondack State Park.

See also 
 List of mountains in New York
 Northeast 111 4,000-footers 
 Adirondack High Peaks
 Adirondack Forty-Sixers

References

External links 
 

Mountains of Essex County, New York
Adirondack High Peaks
Mountains of New York (state)